Veerle Geerinckx (born 3 March 1973 in Dendermonde) is a Belgian politician and curler.

Geerinckx became the first female mayor of Zemst in January 2019.

Teams

Women's

Mixed

Mixed doubles

Personal life
She is married and has four children.

She started curling in 2017.

References

External links

 Veerle Geerinckx - Players Passport - Belgian Curling Association
 

Living people
1973 births
People from Dendermonde
Belgian female curlers

Belgian politicians
New Flemish Alliance politicians
Belgian architects
Belgian sportsperson-politicians
Women mayors of places in Belgium